Lajos Belleli (born 22 July 1977) is a Hungarian male curler and curling coach.

He is six-time Hungarian men's curling champion (2007, 2009, 2010, 2012, 2013, 2014) and Hungarian Men's Curler of the Year (2010).

Teams and events

Record as a coach of national teams

References

External links

1977 births
Living people
Hungarian male curlers
Hungarian curling coaches
Hungarian curling champions